Ted Briscoe was a rugby league footballer in the New South Wales Rugby Football League premiership's inaugural  season - 1908.

Briscoe, who played for the Eastern Suburbs club was a forward in rugby league's first premiership decider.

Ted Briscoe is remembered as the Sydney Roosters 27th player. He played two season For Easts in 1908-1909.

References
 

Australian rugby league players
Sydney Roosters players
Year of birth missing
Year of death missing
Place of birth missing